Unešić is a municipality in Šibenik-Knin County, Croatia. There are 1,686 inhabitants, with 99.70% declaring themselves Croats.

References

Municipalities of Croatia
Populated places in Šibenik-Knin County